Neil Clarke (born 1966) is an American editor and publisher, mainly of science fiction and fantasy stories.

In 2006, Clarke launched Clarkesworld Magazine as a companion to his online bookstore Clarkesworld Books (2000-2007). He serves as the editor-in-chief of the digital publication. Fiction published in Clarkesworld has been nominated for or won the Hugo, Nebula, World Fantasy, Sturgeon, Locus, Ditmar, Aurealis, Shirley Jackson, WSFA Small Press and Stoker Awards. Clarkesworld has been a finalist for the Hugo Award in the Best Semiprozine category four times (2009, 2010, 2011, 2013) winning in 2010, 2011 and 2013. Clarke has been a finalist for the Hugo Award for Best Editor: Short Form in 2012, 2013, 2014, 2016, 2017, 2018, 2019, 2020 and 2021. He received the Kate Wilhelm Solstice Award from Science Fiction and Fantasy Writers of America in May 2019.

When Clarke closed his bookstore in 2007, he launched Wyrm Publishing, which has since published books by Gene Wolfe, Charles Stross, Catherynne M. Valente and others. Clarkesworld Magazine is currently published by Wyrm in online, digital, audio and print editions. He launched Forever Magazine in 2015 and became the editor of The SFWA Bulletin in early 2016. He edits The Best Science Fiction of the Year series for Night Shade Books. He is also the ebook designer for Cheeky Frawg Books, Prime Books, Wyrm Publishing and several magazines.

As of 2022, Clarke and his family reside in New Jersey.

Health
In 2012, Clarke suffered a severe heart attack while attending Readercon, and had a defibrillator implanted. He has credited this event with having led him to become a full-time editor.

Bibliography

Magazines (edited) 
 Clarkesworld Magazine,  2006 - 
 Forever Magazine, 2015 -
 The SFWA Bulletin, Science Fiction and Fantasy Writers of America, 2016 - 2019
 Berlin Quarterly Issue 4, special guest fiction editor
 Internazionale (Guest Editor, Storie Issue), Issue 1338, December 2019

Anthologies (edited) 
 Clarkesworld: Year Three, (with Sean Wallace), Wyrm Publishing, 2013
 Clarkesworld: Year Four, (with Sean Wallace), Wyrm Publishing, 2013
 Clarkesworld: Year Five, (with Sean Wallace), Wyrm Publishing, 2013
 Clarkesworld: Year Six, (with Sean Wallace), Wyrm Publishing, 2014
 
 Clarkesworld: Year Seven, (with Sean Wallace), Wyrm Publishing, 2015
 Clarkesworld: Year Eight, (with Sean Wallace), Wyrm Publishing, 2016
 The Best Science Fiction of the Year Volume 1, Night Shade Books, 2016
 Galactic Empires, Night Shade Books, 2017
 Touchable Unreality, China Machine Press, 2017
 The Best Science Fiction of the Year Volume 2, Night Shade Books, 2017
 More Human Than Human, Night Shade Books, 2017
 The Best Science Fiction of the Year Volume 3, Night Shade Books, 2018
 Clarkesworld: Year Nine, Volume One, (with Sean Wallace), Wyrm Publishing, 2018
 Clarkesworld: Year Nine, Volume Two, (with Sean Wallace), Wyrm Publishing, 2018
 The Final Frontier, Night Shade Books, 2018
 Not One of Us, Night Shade Books, 2018
 The Eagle has Landed, Night Shade Books, 2019
 The Best Science Fiction of the Year Volume 4, Night Shade Books, 2019
 Clarkesworld: Year Ten, Volume One, (with Sean Wallace), Wyrm Publishing, 2019
 Clarkesworld: Year Ten, Volume Two, (with Sean Wallace), Wyrm Publishing, 2019
 Clarkesworld: Year Eleven, Volume One, (with Sean Wallace), Wyrm Publishing, 2019
 Clarkesworld: Year Eleven, Volume Two, (with Sean Wallace), Wyrm Publishing, 2019
 The Best Science Fiction of the Year Volume 5, Night Shade Books, 2020
 Clarkesworld: Year Twelve, Volume One, (with Sean Wallace), Wyrm Publishing, 2021
 Clarkesworld: Year Twelve, Volume Two, (with Sean Wallace), Wyrm Publishing, 2021
 The Best Science Fiction of the Year Volume 6, Night Shade Books, 2022

Critical studies and reviews of Clarke's work
Upgraded

Awards
 Nominee, World Fantasy Special Award: Non-Professional, 2009, 2010, 2012
 Winner, World Fantasy Special Award: Non-Professional, 2014 
 Finalist, Hugo Award for Best Semiprozine, 2009
 Winner, Hugo Award for Best Semiprozine, 2010, 2011, 2013
 Finalist, Hugo Award for Best Editor Short Form, 2012, 2013, 2014, 2016, 2017, 2018, 2019, 2020, 2021
 Winner, Hugo Award for Best Editor Short Form, 2022
 Nominee, Chesley Award for Best Art Director, 2017, 2021 
 Winner, Chesley Award for Best Art Director, 2016, 2018, 2019
 Recipient, The Kate Wilhelm Solstice Award, 2019

References

External links
 Clarkesworld Magazine
 Forever Magazine
 Wyrm Publishing
 Neil Clarke's Blog
 Video Interview with Neil Clarke for Fast Forward: Contemporary Science Fiction (October 2013, aired June 2013)
 Interview at Write 1 Sub 1 (June 2013)

1966 births
Living people
Hugo Award-winning editors
American book editors
American magazine editors
Drew University alumni
Science fiction editors
American speculative fiction editors
American speculative fiction publishers (people)
Male speculative fiction editors